Johnsontown is the name of several communities in the U.S. state of West Virginia.

Johnsontown, Berkeley County, West Virginia
Johnsontown, Jefferson County, West Virginia